The Saxton Baronetcy, of Circourt at Denchworth in the County of Berkshire (now Oxfordshire), was a title in the Baronetage of Great Britain. It was created on 26 July 1794 for Charles Saxton, Commissioner of the Royal Navy. The second Baronet sat as member of parliament for Cashel. The title became extinct on his death in 1838.

Saxton baronets, of Circourt (1794)

Sir Charles Saxton, 1st Baronet (circa 1730–1808)
Sir Charles Saxton, 2nd Baronet (1773–1838)

References

Extinct baronetcies in the Baronetage of Great Britain
People from Vale of White Horse (district)
1794 establishments in Great Britain